Leonid Anatolyevich Voloshin (born 30 March 1966 in Ordzhonikidze) is a retired triple jumper from Russia. He competed at the 1988 Summer Olympics and the 1992 Summer Olympics.

Career 
Voloshin won the European Championships in 1990 as well as two European Indoor titles. He also won two World Championship silvers, in 1991 and 1993. In Tokyo 1991 he achieved a personal best jump of 17.75 metres, which puts him 18th in the all-time performers list.

In long jump he is ranked 22nd with a personal best jump of 8.46 metres (Russia national record until 2013 when Aleksandr Menkov jumped 8.56 m). He switched to triple jump in 1990.

Achievements

References

External links 
 
 
 
 

1966 births
Living people
Russian male triple jumpers
Russian male long jumpers
Soviet male long jumpers
Soviet male triple jumpers
Athletes (track and field) at the 1988 Summer Olympics
Athletes (track and field) at the 1992 Summer Olympics
Olympic athletes of the Soviet Union
Olympic athletes of the Unified Team
World Athletics Championships medalists
European Athletics Championships medalists
Sportspeople from Vladikavkaz
Soviet Athletics Championships winners